A by-election was held for the New South Wales Legislative Assembly electorate of The Hastings and Manning on 5 April 1890 because of the resignation of Charles Roberts to visit England.

Dates

Result

Charles Roberts resigned.

See also
Electoral results for the district of Hastings and Manning
List of New South Wales state by-elections

References

1890 elections in Australia
New South Wales state by-elections
1890s in New South Wales